Lake Merwin is a reservoir on the Lewis River in the U.S. state of Washington. It lies on the border between Clark County and Cowlitz County. It was created in 1931 with the construction of Merwin Dam.

See also
List of lakes in Washington (state)
List of dams in the Columbia River watershed

References 

Reservoirs in Washington (state)
Lakes of Clark County, Washington
Lakes of Cowlitz County, Washington
Protected areas of Clark County, Washington
Protected areas of Cowlitz County, Washington